Brescia University is a private Roman Catholic university in Owensboro, Kentucky. It was founded as a junior college for women and is now a coeducational university offering undergraduate and master's programs.

History
Brescia University traces its roots to Mount Saint Joseph Junior College for Women founded in 1925 by the Ursuline Sisters of Mount Saint Joseph at Maple Mount, a rural area outside Owensboro. Coeducational extension courses were started at Owensboro and eventually grew into its own campus. After World War II the two campuses were consolidated, thus becoming fully co-educational. In 1951, it was renamed Brescia College, after the Italian city of Brescia where Saint Angela Merici founded the original order. It attained university status in 1998 to become Brescia University with the addition of Master's degree programs in Management, and Curriculum and Instruction.

Notable alumni
 Joey Goebel, author
 Chris Holtmann, current head men's basketball coach at Ohio State (did not graduate; transferred to Taylor University)

Athletics
The Brescia athletic teams are called the Bearcats. The university is a member of the National Association of Intercollegiate Athletics (NAIA), primarily competing in the River States Conference (RSC; formerly known as the Kentucky Intercollegiate Athletic Conference (KIAC) until after the 2015–16 school year) since the 1984–85 academic year.

Brescia competes in 18 intercollegiate varsity sports: Men's sports include baseball, basketball, cross country, golf, soccer, tennis and track & field; while women's sports include basketball, cross country, golf, soccer, softball, tennis, track & field and volleyball; and co-ed sports compete in cheerleading, dance and eSports.

References

External links
 Official website
 Official athletics website

Buildings and structures in Owensboro, Kentucky
Liberal arts colleges in Kentucky
Universities and colleges accredited by the Southern Association of Colleges and Schools
Association of Catholic Colleges and Universities
Education in Daviess County, Kentucky
River States Conference
1950 establishments in Kentucky
Educational institutions established in 1950
Catholic universities and colleges in Kentucky
Ursuline colleges and universities
Former women's universities and colleges in the United States
Brescia University